Napadogan is a community in the Canadian province of New Brunswick.

Mining

Northcliff Resources Ltd. and the Sissom Partnership have proposed to build a  tungsten and molybdenum mine, the Sisson Mine, near Napadogan. Some members of the Maliseet First Nation and other residents are protesting against the potential environmental hazards represented by the mine.

History

Notable people

See also
List of communities in New Brunswick

References

Communities in York County, New Brunswick